The 1955 Kansas State Wildcats football team represented Kansas State University in the 1955 college football season.  The team's head football coach was Bus Mertes, in his first year at the helm of the Wildcats.  The Wildcats played their home games in Memorial Stadium.  1955 saw the Wildcats finish with a record of 4–6, and a 3–3 record in Big Seven Conference play.  The Wildcats scored 165 points while giving up 191.  They finished tied for third in the Big Seven. Ten Days before the Kansas game on November 5, K-State's mascot Touchdown IV was stolen by Kansas students.  At the end of the first quarter the mascot was returned but the theft had already been avenged as K-State led the Jayhawks, 26–0, at that point and went on to defeat Kansas, 46–0.

Schedule

References

Kansas State
Kansas State Wildcats football seasons
Kansas State Wildcats football